The boys' singles tournament of the 2022 European Junior Badminton Championships was held from 22 to 27 August. Christo Popov from France clinched this title in the last edition.

Seeds 
Seeds were announced on 5 August.

  Alex Lanier (champion, gold medalist)
  Tauri Kilk (quarter-finals)
  Paul Tournefier (quarter-finals)
  Simon Baron-Vézilier (fourth round)
  Sanjeevi Vasudevan (quarter-finals)
  Luca Zhou (second round)
  Karim Krehemeier (third round)
  Charles Fouyn (quarter-finals)

  Christian Faust Kjær (semi-finals, bronze medalist)
  Alessandro Gozzini (fourth round)
  Nicolas Franconville (third round)
  Noah Haase (fourth round)
  Kenneth Neumann (third round)
  Kristof Toth (third round)
  Ruben García (third round)
  Lorrain Joliat (fourth round)

Draw

Finals

Top half

Section 1

Section 2

Section 3

Section 4

Bottom half

Section 5

Section 6

Section 7

Section 8

References

External links 
Draw

2022 European Junior Badminton Championships